The Prowers Bridge over the Arkansas River near Prowers, Colorado is a historic bridge that was built in 1902 by the Pueblo Bridge Co.  It includes 3 Camelback truss, 2 Pratt through truss and one Pratt pony truss components.  It was listed on the National Register of Historic Places in 1985.

It is the last surviving out of more than 6 multispan bridges built during 1890-1910 that crossed the wide floodplains of the lower Arkansas River.

References 

Road bridges on the National Register of Historic Places in Colorado
Bridges completed in 1902
Bridges over the Arkansas River
National Register of Historic Places in Bent County, Colorado
Pratt truss bridges in the United States
Parker truss bridges in the United States
Pony truss bridges
1902 establishments in Arkansas